Thomas Lux (December 10, 1946 – February 5, 2017) was an American poet who held the Margaret T. and Henry C. Bourne, Jr. Chair in Poetry at the Georgia Institute of Technology and ran Georgia Tech's "Poetry @ Tech" program. He wrote fourteen books of poetry.

Early life and education
Thomas Lux was born in Northampton, Massachusetts, son of a milkman and a Sears & Roebuck switchboard operator, neither of whom graduated from high school. Lux was raised in Massachusetts on a dairy farm.

Lux graduated from Emerson College in Boston, where he was also poet in residence from 1970–1975. His first book—Memory's Handgrenade—was published shortly after.

Academic career
Lux was a member of the writing faculty at Sarah Lawrence College, where he taught for twenty-seven years, from 1975 until 2001. He was also a core faculty member of the Warren Wilson M.F.A. Program for Writers. In 1996 he was a visiting professor at University of California, Irvine. A former Guggenheim Fellow and three times a recipient of grants from the National Endowment for the Arts, Lux received, in 1995, the $50,000 Kingsley Tufts Poetry Award for his sixth collection, Split Horizons. In 2003, Lux was awarded an honorary doctorate of Letters from Emerson College. His poems were featured in many notable anthologies, including American Alphabets: 25 Contemporary Poets (2006). In 2012, Lux received the Robert Creeley Award.

At the time of his death in February 2017, Lux was the Margaret T. and Henry C. Bourne, Jr. Chair in Poetry at the Georgia Institute of Technology where he began teaching in 2001.  At Georgia Tech he ran their "Poetry at Tech" program, which included one of the best known poetry reading series in the country, along with community outreach classes and workshops.

Before his death, Lux edited (and wrote the Introduction to) Bill Knott's posthumous publication I Am Flying into Myself: Selected Poems 1960–2014 which appeared in February 2017.

Death
Lux died of lung cancer at his home in Atlanta, Georgia on February 5, 2017, survived by his wife Jennifer Holley Lux and a daughter from a previous marriage, Claudia Lux.

Bibliography

Poetry
Collections
 
 
 Sunday (1979)
 Half Promised Land (1986)
 The Drowned River (1990)
 Split Horizon (1994)
 The Blind Swimmer: Selected Early Poems, 1970–1975 (1996)
 New and Selected Poems, 1975–1995 (1997)
 The Street of Clocks (2001)
 The Cradle Place (2004)
 God Particles (2008)
 Child Made of Sand (2012)
 Selected Poems (Bloodaxe Books, UK, 2014) 
 To the Left of Time (2016)
Chapbooks
 The Land Sighted (chapbook, 1970)
 Madrigal on the Way Home (chapbook, 1976)
 Like a Wide Anvil from the Moon the Light (chapbook, 1980)
 Massachusetts (chapbook, 1981)
 Tarantulas on the Lifebuoy (chapbook, 1983)
 A Boat in the Forest (chapbook, 1992)
 Pecked to Death by Swans (chapbook, 1993)
List of poems

References

External links

 Love It Hard: Thomas Lux On Poetry, profile and interview with Sally Molini in Cerise Press, Summer 2009
 Academy of American Poets profile
 A few poems by Thomas Lux
 Online interview with Lux
 Poetry at Tech
 

1946 births
2017 deaths
20th-century American poets
21st-century American poets
Lux,Thomas
Georgia Tech faculty
Iowa Writers' Workshop alumni
Iowa Writers' Workshop faculty
The New Yorker people
Sarah Lawrence College faculty
Writers from Northampton, Massachusetts